Michael Noer (born 27 December 1978) is a Danish film director.

Education and career 
Noer studied at the European Film College and later at the National Film School of Denmark, where he graduated from the documentary programme in 2003. His 2007 documentary, Vesterbro, received a Special Mention at the Copenhagen International Documentary Festival (CPH:DOX).

Co-directing with Tobias Lindholm, Noer made his narrative feature debut with the 2010 prison drama R, which won the Bodil Award for Best Danish Film and the Robert Award for Best Danish Film and earned them the Robert Award for Best Director. He subsequently directed Northwest and Key House Mirror, which were released in 2013 and in 2015, respectively. In 2017, his first English-language film, Papillon, a remake of the 1973 film, premiered at the Toronto International Film Festival.

In 2018, Before the Frost, his fifth feature set in 19th-century rural Denmark, premiered at the Toronto International Film Festival. It also competed at the Tokyo International Film Festival, where it won the Special Jury Prize and the Award for Best Actor.

Filmography

References

External links 
 

1978 births
Danish documentary film directors
Danish film directors
Danish male screenwriters
Living people
People from Esbjerg